Ryan T. “R.T.” Moore is a retired American soccer defender who spent a season and a half in Major League Soccer with the Tampa Bay Mutiny.

Youth
Moore played organized soccer first with Rockford United Soccer Club  in Rockford, Illinois before joining Chicago Pegasus.  He graduated from Boylan Catholic High School in 1993.  He attended the University of Maryland, College Park, playing on the men's soccer team from 1994 to 1997.  He earned a bachelor's degree in biology with a plan to become a dentist.

Professional
On February 1, 1998, the Tampa Bay Mutiny selected Brown in the third round (thirty-fourthoverall) of the 1998 MLS College Draft.  He became a starter his rookie season and continued in the starting line-up in 1999.  In July 1999, he announced he was retiring to pursue a career in dentistry.  Moore spent the 2000 summer season with the Rockford Raptors of the USL Premier Development League.

In 2003, he played a small part in the movie The Game of Their Lives.

References

External links
 Ryan T. Moore, DMD
 

1976 births
Living people
American soccer players
Maryland Terrapins men's soccer players
Major League Soccer players
Rockford Raptors players
Tampa Bay Mutiny players
MLS Pro-40 players
A-League (1995–2004) players
Tampa Bay Mutiny draft picks
Association football defenders